Lieutenant-General Sir Charles Noel Frank Broad KCB DSO (29 December 1882 – 23 March 1976) was a British Army General during the Second World War.

Military career
The son of Major C. H. Broad, Northumberland Fusiliers, Broad was educated at Wellington College and Pembroke College, Cambridge University. He served in South Africa 1901-02 as an officer of the 3rd (Militia) battalion York & Lancaster regiment.

Broad was commissioned in 1904 into the Cambridge University Volunteers, then into the Royal Field Artillery in May 1905 and went to the Staff College, Camberley in 1914.

He also served in the First World War in France and Belgium, mostly on the staff. He was awarded the Distinguished Service Order in June 1917, "for distinguished service in the field."

He transferred to the Royal Tank Corps in 1923 and became Commander of the 1st Brigade of the Royal Tank Corps in 1931 before being appointed General Officer Commanding-in-Chief for Aldershot Command in 1939. He became General Officer Commanding-in-Chief for the Eastern Army in India in 1940: in that capacity he welcomed the 7th Armoured Brigade back from Burma: he retired in 1942.

He was also Colonel Commandant of the Royal Tank Regiment from 1939 to 1949.

References

Bibliography

External links
Generals of World War II

 

|-
 

1882 births
1976 deaths
British Army lieutenant generals
British Army personnel of World War I
British Army generals of World War II
Knights Commander of the Order of the Bath
DSO
Royal Tank Regiment officers
British Army personnel of the Second Boer War
People educated at Wellington College, Berkshire
Alumni of Pembroke College, Cambridge
York and Lancaster Regiment officers
Royal Artillery officers
Graduates of the Staff College, Camberley